Plagioscion is a genus of hardheads, ray-finned fish in the family Sciaenidae. They are found in tropical and subtropical South America where they inhabit fresh and brackish waters. Some species (notably P. squamosissimus and P. surinamensis) are important food fish and support major fisheries.

In general, the various species are similar and are not easily separated by meristics or colour.

Plagioscion sometimes occur in schools. They are predators and the adults are essentially piscivorous.

Although the family Sciaenidae primarily is marine, there are four genera with freshwater species in South America. In addition to Plagioscion, this is Pachypops, Pachyurus and Petilipinnis.

Species
FishBase currently recognizes 7 species in this genus. The validity of P. casattii and P. surinamensis are questionable (both possibly junior synonyms of P. squamosissimus). In contrast, genetic analysis indicates that two currently unrecognized, cryptic species exist.

 Plagioscion auratus Castelnau, 1855 (Black curbinata)
 Plagioscion casattii Aguilera & de Aguilera, 2001 
 Plagioscion montei Soares & Casatti, 2000
 Plagioscion pauciradiatus Steindachner, 1917	
 Plagioscion squamosissimus Heckel, 1840 (South American silver croaker)
 Plagioscion surinamensis Bleeker, 1873 (Pacora)
 Plagioscion ternetzi Boulenger, 1895 (Freshwater croaker)

References

Sciaenidae